The Ministry of Interior of Egypt is a part of the Cabinet of Egypt. It is responsible for law enforcement in Egypt.

The Ministry of Interior directs the Central Security Forces, around 410,000 in 2012; the National Police, around 500,000; and the Egyptian Homeland security, around 200,000 strong.

The Egyptian Border Guard Corps were organised in border guard regiments totaling approximately 25,000 members. They are a lightly armed paramilitary force, mostly Bedouins, responsible for border surveillance, general peacekeeping, drug interdiction, and prevention of smuggling. During the late 1980s, the force was equipped with remote sensors and night-vision binoculars. High-speed motorboats are also in service. The Border Guards were originally under the control of the Ministry of Defense, however control was almost immediately given to the Ministry of Interior after their creation.

Headquarters
On 27 April 2016, President Abdel Fattah Al-Sisi inaugurated the new headquarters of the ministry in New Cairo.

Ministers
 Muhammad Tawfiq Nasim Pasha, November 1919 - May 1920
 Isma'il Sidqi, 1922, and again from 1924 - 1925
 Ahmed Lutfi el-Sayed
 Fouad Serageddin, 1950–1952
 Zakaria Mohieddin, 1953–1962 (from 1958 to 1961 Central Minister of Interior for U.A.R.)
 Zakaria Mohieddin, 1965–1966
 Sharawi Gomaa, 1966–1971
 Mamdouh Salem
 Nabawi İsmail, 1977 – January 1982
 Hassan Abu Basha, January 1982–July 1984
 Ahmed Rushdi, 1984–February 1986 
 Zaki Badr, February 1986 - 1990
 Abdul Halim Moussa, 1990 - 1993
 Hassan Al Alfi, 1993 - 1997
 Habib el-Adly, 1997 - January 2011
 Mahmoud Wagdy, January 2011 - March 2011
 Mansour el-Essawy, March 2011 - November 2011
 Mohamed Youssef Ibrahim, December 2011 - August 2012 
 Ahmed Gamal El Din, August 2012 - January 2013
 Mohamed Ibrahim Moustafa, January 2013 – March 2015
 Magdy Abdel Ghaffar, March 2015 – June 2018
 Mahmoud Tawfik, June 2018 – Present

See also

 Cabinet of Egypt
 Egyptian police casualties since 2011

References

External links

View the Ministry of Interior during the January 25 Revolution in the University on the Square: Documenting Egypt's 21st Century Revolution digital collection.
Egypt's Cabinet Database

Interior
Law enforcement agencies of Egypt
Egypt
1857 establishments in Egypt